The Individual competition at the FIS Ski Flying World Championships 2022 was held on 11 and 12 March 2022, with the qualification being held on 10 March.

Qualification
Qualification was held on 10 March 2022 at 15:50.

Results
The first two rounds were held on 11 March at 16:30 and the final rounds on 12 March at 16:30.

References

Individual